Havenscourt is a neighborhood of Oakland in Alameda County, California.

Schools
Middle school campus located in the Havenscourt neighborhood housing the Coliseum College Prep Academy  which was established in 2006 from the breakup of Havenscourt Middle School.

References
USGS Geographic Names Information System

Neighborhoods in Oakland, California